Methionine aminopeptidase 2 is an enzyme that in humans is encoded by the METAP2 gene.

Methionine aminopeptidase 2, a member of the dimetallohydrolase family, is a cytosolic metalloenzyme that catalyzes the hydrolytic removal of N-terminal methionine residues from nascent proteins.

 peptide-methionine  peptide + methionine

MetAP2 is found in all organisms and is especially important because of its critical role in tissue repair and protein degradation. Furthermore, MetAP2 is of particular interest because the enzyme plays a key role in angiogenesis, the growth of new blood vessels, which is necessary for the progression of diseases including solid tumor cancers and rheumatoid arthritis. MetAP2 is also the target of two groups of anti-angiogenic natural products, ovalicin and fumagillin, and their analogs such as beloranib.

Structure 

In living organisms, the start codon that initiates protein synthesis codes for either methionine (eukaryotes) or formylmethionine (prokaryotes). In E. coli (prokaryote), an enzyme called formylmethionine deformylase can cleave the formyl group, leaving just the N-terminal methionine residue. For proteins with small, uncharged penultimate N-terminal residues, a methionine aminopeptidase can cleave the methionine residue.
The number of genes encoding for a methionine aminopeptidase varies between organisms. In E. coli, there is only one known MetAP, a 29,333 Da monomeric enzyme coded for by a gene consisting of 264 codons. The knockout of this gene in E. coli leads to cell inviability. In humans, there are two genes encoding MetAP, MetAP1 and MetAP2. MetAP1 codes for a 42 kDa enzyme, while MetAP2 codes for a 67 kDa enzyme. Yeast MetAP1 is 40 percent homologous to E. coli MetAP; within S. cerevisiae, MetAP2 is 22 percent homologous with the sequence of MetAP1; MetAP2 is highly conserved between S. cerevisiae and humans. In contrast to prokaryotes, eukaryotic S. cerevisiae strains lacking the gene for either MetAP1 or MetAP2 are viable, but exhibit a slower growth rate than a control strain expressing both genes.

Active site 

The active site of MetAP2 has a structural motif characteristic of many metalloenzymes—including the dioxygen carrier protein, hemerythrin; the dinuclear non-heme iron protein, ribonucleotide reductase; leucine aminopeptidase; urease; arginase; several phosphatases and phosphoesterases—that includes two bridging carboxylate ligands and a bridging water or hydroxide ligand. Specifically in human MetAP2 (PDB: 1BOA), one of the catalytic metal ions is bound to His331, Glu364, Glu459, Asp263, and a bridging water or hydroxide, while the other metal ion is bound to Asp251 (bidentate), App262 (bidentate), Glu459, and the same bridging water or hydroxide. Here, the two bridging carboxylates are Asp262 and Glu459.

Dimetal center 

The identity of the active site metal ions under physiological conditions has not been successfully established, and remains a controversial issue. MetAP2 shows activity in the presence of Zn(II), Co(II), Mn(II), and Fe(II) ions, and various authors have argued any given metal ion is the physiological one: some in the presence of iron, others in cobalt, others in manganese, and yet others in the presence of zinc. Nonetheless, the majority of crystallographers have crystallized MetAP2 either in the presence of Zn(II) or Co(II) (see PDB database).

Mechanism

The bridging water or hydroxide ligand acts as a nucleophile during the hydrolysis reaction, but the exact mechanism of catalysis is not yet known. The catalytic mechanisms of hydrolase enzymes depend greatly on the identity of the bridging ligand, which can be challenging to determine due to the difficulty of studying hydrogen atoms via x-ray crystallography.

The histidine residues shown in the mechanism to the right, H178 and H79, are conserved in all MetAPs (MetAP1s and MetAP2s) sequenced to date, suggesting their presence is important to catalytic activity. Based upon X-ray crystallographic data, histidine 79 (H79) has been proposed to help position the methionine residue in the active site and transfer a proton to the newly exposed N-terminal amine. Lowther and Colleagues have proposed two possible mechanisms for MetAP2 in E. coli, shown at the right.

Function 

While previous studies have indicated MetAP2 catalyzes the removal of N-terminal methionine residues in vitro, the function of this enzyme in vivo may be more complex. For example, a significant correlation exists between the inhibition of the enzymatic activity of MetAP2 and inhibition of cell growth, thus implicating the enzyme in endothelial cell proliferation. For this reason, scientists have singled out MetAP2 as a potential target for the inhibition of angiogenesis. Moreover, studies have demonstrated that MetAP2 copurifies and interacts with the α subunit of eukaryotic initiation factor 2 (eIF2), a protein that is necessary for protein synthesis in vivo. Specifically, MetAP2 protects eIF-2α from inhibitory phosphorylation from the enzyme eIF-2α kinase, inhibits RNA-dependent protein kinase (PKR)-catalyzed eIF-2 R-subunit phosphorylation, and also reverses PKR-mediated inhibition of protein synthesis in intact cells.

Clinical significance 

Numerous studies implicate MetAP2 in angiogenesis. Specifically, the covalent binding of either the ovalicin or fumagillin epoxide moiety to the active site histidine residue of MetAP2 has been shown to inactivate the enzyme, thereby inhibiting angiogenesis. The way in which MetAP2 regulates angiogenesis has yet to be established, however, such that further study is required to validate that antiangiogenic activity results directly from MetAP2 inhibition. Nevertheless, with both the growth and metastasis of solid tumors depending heavily on angiogenesis, fumagillin and its analogs—including TNP-470, caplostatin, and beloranib—as well as ovalicin represent potential anticancer agents.
Moreover, the ability of MetAP2 to decrease cell viability in prokaryotic and small eukaryotic organisms has made it a target for antibacterial agents. Thus far, both fumagillin and TNP-470 have been shown to possess antimalarial activity both in vitro and in vivo, and fumarranol, another fumagillin analog, represents a promising lead.

The METAP2 inhibitor beloranib (ZGN-433) has shown efficacy in reducing weight in severely obese subjects. MetAP2 inhibitors work by re-establishing balance to the ways the body metabolizes fat, leading to substantial loss of body weight. Development of beloranib was halted in 2016 after deaths during clinical trials.

Interactions 
METAP2 has been shown to interact with Protein kinase R.

References

Further reading

EC 3.4.11
Human proteins
Articles containing video clips